Karup is a town in Viborg Municipality, Denmark.

Notable people 
 Morten Bødskov (born 1970, in Karup) is a Danish politician, serving as the Minister of Taxation since 2019

References

Cities and towns in the Central Denmark Region
Viborg Municipality